Judith Claire Bethel (born 24 August 1943 in Winnipeg, Manitoba) was a member of the House of Commons of Canada for the Edmonton East electoral district from 1993 to 1997.

As part of the Liberal Party of Canada, Bethel was elected in the 1993 federal election. She served in the 35th Canadian Parliament, after which she was unsuccessful in gaining a second term in office. She was defeated by the Reform party's Peter Goldring in the 1997 federal election. Since then, Bethel made no further attempts to return to Parliament.

Her son John was the Liberal nominee for the riding in the 2004 election but was unsuccessful.

References 

1943 births
Women members of the House of Commons of Canada
Edmonton city councillors
Liberal Party of Canada MPs
Living people
Members of the House of Commons of Canada from Alberta
Politicians from Winnipeg
Women in Alberta politics
Women municipal councillors in Canada